Malavasi is the surname of:

 Mauro Malavasi (born 1957), Italian pianist, songwriter and producer
 Ray Malavasi (1930–1987), American football coach, former head coach of two NFL teams (Denver Broncos and Los Angeles Rams)
 Renato Malavasi (1904–1998), Italian film actor

Italian-language surnames